The Indian military bands consists of musicians from the Indian Army, Navy and Air Force. Indian military bands regularly participate in international festivals and take part in celebrations dedicated to various national events. These 
bands are permanent participants in the Delhi Republic Day parade on the Rajpath. Today, the Indian Armed Forces have more than 50 military brass bands and 400 pipe bands and corps of drums. A Tri-Services Band refers to a joint Indian Armed Forces military band that performs together as a unit. At the Spasskaya Tower Military Music Festival and Tattoo in Moscow, the band consisted of 7 officers and 55 musicians. The Military Music Wing of the Army Education Corps is the principal educational institution of the armed forces that provides instruction to musicians of all ranks. Instruction is also provided by the Military Music Training Center and the Indian Navy School of Music.

In the Indian Army, the following commands maintain their own inspectorates for music: Eastern Command, Central Command, Northern Command, South Western Command, Southern Command, and the Western Command. The military bands in the Indian Armed Forces consist of a mix of instruments from the woodwind family, brass family, and percussion family and sometimes are simply either brass bands or wind bands. The Indian military also has dedicated pipe band bands that serves as independent units and are maintained by all infantry regiments. Most senior military bands can be configured from a marching band to a concert band and can also form smaller ensembles to jazz ensembles, traditional music bands, brass quintets, woodwind and drumlines. A general military band consists of a band master and 33 musicians while a pipe band consists of a band master and 17 musicians. Bandsmen in the Indian Army are soldiers first, having the primary role in battle of medical assistants.

History

Martial music has been a part of Indian culture since the era of the Maratha Empire in the 17th century. Organized military bands were brought to India by the British Army as military bands early as the 1700s. In 1813, within a letter to the Military Secretary of the Commander-in-chief of Fort St. George, an army Colonel urged 
the formation of military bands in the native regiments of the East India Company as a means "of improving the appreciation of European 
music amongst the Indian population". Prior to World War I each battalion-sized regiment of the Indian Army had its own military band.

There is no exact introduction year of pipe bands in the Indian military forces. When it was introduced it came into ethnically Sikh, Gorkha, and Pathan regiments in the late 19th century. The first fully Sikh pipe band was established circa 1856 when the 45th Rattray Regiment was established in Punjab. Since then, Sikh Pipe bands have been a part of the Sikh Regiments that were established under British rule. British Indian regiments with pipe bands included the Bombay Volunteer Rifles and the Calcutta Scottish. The Military Music Wing came into fruition on 23 October 1950 under the patronage and supervision of K. M. Cariappa, the then C-in-C of the Army. In the early-mid 50s, the Indianization of formerly British military bands took place, with Harold Joseph, the then music director of the Indian Army, leading the revitalization of Indigenous tunes in the Indian military.

Primary bands

Indian Army Chief's Band
The Indian Army Chief's Band was founded in 1990 as the official band of the Indian Army and the foremost in the armed forces. It also, as its name implies, represents the Chief of the Army Staff at events involving the COAS's presence. The band represents India in most important state events held in the Indian capital. It also has represented India at various military music festivals in France, Italy, Sweden, Germany, Great Britain, Russia and Bangladesh.

Indian Naval Symphonic Band

The Indian Naval Symphonic Band has been considered as one of the best military bands in Asia. It was founded in 1945. The Naval Musicians are known as unofficial ambassadors of the country. As Musician Officers they are responsible for conducting the Naval Band at ceremonies and symphonic band concerts in India and abroad.

No. 1 Air Force Band

The No. 1 Air Force Band (also known as the Indian Air Force Band) is the primary musical unit of the Indian Air Force. The first IAF military band was formed on 10 June 1944 as the RIAF Central Band and is currently stationed in Jalahalli. The concert band unit of the IAF Band is the Air Warrior Symphony Orchestra (AWSO), formed in June 2002. The AWSO has performed at many concerts across the world in countries like France, Italy, Germany, Malaysia, Singapore, and Bangladesh. The AWSO consists of hand-picked musicians from various Air Force Bands.

Other bands

Army bands
Army bands are directly reporting units of their regimental center or part of the educational institution:

 Artillery Centre Band Nasik
Hyderabad Artillery Center Band
Band of the Brigade of the Guards Training Centre
Band of the Rajputana Rifles Centre
Madras Regiment Band
The Grenadiers Regimental Centre Brass Band
Maratha Light Infantry Band
Jat Regiment Centre Band
Ladakh Scouts Centre Band
1 EME Band
Corps of Signals Training Centre Band
Bombay Engineer Group and Centre Band
Madras Engineer Group and Centre Band
Mechanised Infantry Regiment Centre Band
Dogra Regiment Band
The Garhwal Rifles Band
Bengal Engineer Group Centre Band
Parachute Regimental Centre Band
Dogra Scouts Band
39 Gorkha Training Centre Band
11th Gorkha Rifles Centre Band
14 Gorkha Training Centre Band
58 Gorkha Training Centre Band
Indian Military Academy Band
Officers Training Academy Band
Territorial Army Bands under various TA battalions
Indian Army Grand Symphony Band
Armoured Corps Centre & School Band
1 Signal Training Centre Band (Jabalpur)
Mahar Regiment Band
Jammu and Kashmir Light Infantry Band
Pioneer Corps Training Center Band
Corps of Military Police Band
Army Service Corps North Band

Navy Bands

The following bands operate in the country:

Eastern Naval Command Band
Western Naval Command Band
Southern Naval Command Band
INS Chilka Band (Orissa), serves the sailor training establishment on base
INS Cicars Band (Fort Cochin), serves the Gunnery Training School
INS Dronacharya Band (Fort Kochi)
INS Hamla Band (Marve), serves under the Logistic, EDP and Cookery schools 
INS India Band (New Delhi)
INS Jarawa Band (Port Blair)
INS Kunjali Band (Bombay), serves in an official capacity as the Indian Navy Central Band
INS Mandovi Band (Goa), serves the Indian Naval Academy
INS Shivaji Band (Lonavla), serves under the Engineering Training School
INS Valsura Band (Jamnagar), serves at the Electrical Training School
INS Venduruthy Band (Cochin)
INS Viraat Band

Bands often embarks on goodwill visits to different countries by means of its ship base. All navy musicians must have a bachelor’s degree from recognized university and can play at least one military sponsored instrument.

Air Force Bands

Since 1944, eight regional bands have operated in the country:

 No.1 Air Force Band (Formed 10 June 1944, stationed in Jalahalli)
 No.2 Air Force Band (Formed 22 July 1949, stationed in New Delhi)
 No.3 Air Force Band (Formed 28 April 1961, stationed at the Dundigal)
 No.4 Air Force Band (Formed 28 April 1961, stationed in Bamrauli)
 No.5 Air Force Band (Formed 28 April 1961, stationed in Nagpur)
 No.6 Air Force Band (Formed 13 January 1969, stationed in Palam)
 No.7 Air Force Band (Formed 13 January 1969, stationed in Guwahati)
 No.8 Air Force Band (Formed 1999, stationed in Gandhinagar)

The current director of music for the Indian Air Force is Flight Lieutenant LS Rupachandra.

Air Force Academy Band
The No.3 Air Force Band is attached to the Indian Air Force Academy, and has been configured that way since 1971.  Musicians are required to read and write in English and have a height of 167 cm. Musicians must be aged between 17 and 22 years old at the time of their employment.

In December 1996, 20 members of the band died in a plane crash involving a Hawker Siddeley HS 748 in Dundigal.

Pipe bands

Madras Regiment Pipes and Drums
Punjab Regiment Pipes and Drums
The Garhwal Rifles Pipes and Drums
Pipes and Drums of Indian Army Gorkha Rifle Regiments
 Pipes and Drums of 1st Gorkha Rifles
 Pipes and Drums of 3rd Gorkha Rifles
 Pipes and Drums of 5th Battalion, 4 Gorkha Rifles
 Pipes and Drums of 5th Gorkha Rifles (Frontier Force)
 Pipes and Drums of 11th Gorkha Rifles
14 Gorkha Training Centre Pipes and Drums
Assam Regiment Pipes and Drums
Dogra Regiment Pipes and Drums
Sikh Regiment Pipes and Drums
Rajputana Rifles Pipes and Drums
Kumaon Regiment Pipes and Drums
Ladakh Scouts Pipes and Drums
Pipes and Drums of The Grenadiers
Pipes and Drums of the Jammu and Kashmir Rifles
Pipes and Drums of the 12th Assam Rifles

In December 2018, the British Band Instrument Company announced a new agreement with the Indian Army to supply all Regimental Centres with modern bagpipes and percussion instruments for their pipe bands. The new bagpipes were played for the first time on Republic Day 2019.

Youth cadet bands

The National Cadet Corps maintains two cadet bands: the Boys Band of the NCC and the Girls Band of the NCC. They are commonly formed up during the NCC Republic Day Camp in late January, during which the bands participate in the Republic Day Parade on 26 January and the Prime Minister's Rally on 28 January.

Paramilitary bands
The following Indian paramilitary forces maintain military bands:

Central Reserve Police Force Brass Band
Central Industrial Security Force Band
Border Security Force Brass Band
Border Security Force Camel Band
Band and Pipes and Drums of the Assam Rifles
Other Assam Rifles Bands
Indo-Tibetan Border Police Central Band
Bihar Military Police Band
Kolkata Armed Police Band

Central Reserve Police Force Brass Band
The Central Reserve Police Force Brass Band, which consists of 38 musicians, was raised in 1961. A pipe band was established earlier in the CRPF in 1952. At a large parade, the band can increase its size three-fold.

BSF Mounted Band

The 36-member camel mounted band of the Border Security Force is one of two official bands in the BSF. It is the only camel mounted military band in the world, and is mentioned in Guinness Book of World Records as such. It is one of the unique sights of the Delhi Republic Day parade and has been an annual participant since 1990. The only time it has missed a parade was in 2016 due to a lack of preparation.

Bands of the Assam Rifles
Different units of the Assam Rifles maintain battalion jazz and pipe bands. For example, the 12 Assam Rifles has a pipe band that was raised in Wokha in 1959. In 2011, the 43 Assam Rifles began its own jazz band in a remote village in Senapati as a means to bring music to the people of that area. Brass bands are maintained at the Assam Rifles Training Centre and School.

With the sanction of the Commandant of the Assam Rifles, bands can engage in events hosted by private entities. The band of a unit is managed by a committee of three 
officers that are appointed quarterly. When massed bands are on parade, the senior bandmaster normally conducts (with the exception of the parade commander changing him/her at their discretion). All bands are provided with copies of Jana Gana Mana and all regimental marches in the Assam Rifles. As a matter of tradition, all 
bands adhere to high pitch when performing.

Indo-Tibetan Border Police Band
The Indo-Tibetan Border Police Brass Band was raised in 1973 and has been participating in Republic Day Parade annually since 1977. It has won best marching contingent in parade during the year 1998, 1999, 2000, 2004 and 2011 by marching on brass band tunes.

Events

Republic Day parade
Indian military bands play an active role in the annual Delhi Republic Day parade on the Rajpath. It is the largest and central of the parades marking the Republic Day celebrations in India. The bands of nine to twelve different Army regiments, as well as bands from the Navy and the Air Force march in the parade. Sub Lieutenant Ramesh Chand Katoch has set a record for leading a band contingent on the Rajpath the most, leading the Navy Band in 20 out 30 consecutive parades.

Beating Retreat
The Beating Retreat is a massive gathering of Indian military bands held on Republic Day in the capital of New Delhi. It is organized by Section D of the Ministry of Defence.  It is based on a 16th-century military ceremony in England that was first used to recall nearby patrolling units to their castle. The ceremony happens at Vijay Chowk, and involves Indian military bands as well as the bands of the paramilitary services and the Delhi Police Band. Brass bands, pipes bands, and buglers from various Army Regiments perform at the ceremony. National and religious pieces such as Abide With Me, Sare Jahan se Accha and sunset. The ceremony achieved a Guinness World Record mention for being the largest military band under one conductor, with its rendition of Amazing Grace including 4,459 musicians.

Independence Day
Military bands perform on Independence Day during the ceremony at the historical site of Red Fort in Delhi.

Changing of the Guard
A ceremonial changing of the guard is held at the President of India's residence, the Rashtrapati Bhavan. It is held with the participation of supporting Indian military bands as well as President's Body Guard and the Brigade of the Guards. As the sentries are nominated and inspected by their officers, the band plays 'Sammaan Guard' (The Honour Guard) as a slow march before following that up with a formal march into the forecourt of the palace with the band playing "Sher-E-Jawan" (Tiger of a soldier). Other notable protocol tunes played at the ceremony include "Robinson" and "Saare Jahan Se Achcha" (Better than any nation). Once they assume charge, the New Guard marches off along with the band playing "Amar Jawan" (Immortal Soldier).

Military Band Concert
The Military Band Concert is an annual event that is part of the Vijay Diwas celebrations organized to commemorate the victory in the Indo-Pakistani War of 1971 and the Bangladesh Liberation War. Apart from marching tunes, Bengali and Bangladeshi songs are also performed by band members.

Passing out parades
Bands commonly perform at Passing out parades for military cadets. Throughout the Commonwealth of Nations, the traditions for these ceremonies are the same, Auld Lang Syne by Robert Burns often being played. At the Indian Military Academy, before the cadets begin the passing out parade ceremony, the band plays a melody (aarti), allowing the cadets to pray to their respective god.

Foreign tattoos and parades
In July 2009, Indian military bands marched down the Champs-Élysées with contingents from their respective services during the Bastille Day military parade to the sound of the military bands playing Indian martial tunes including Saare Jahan Se Achcha, Haste Lushai and Kadam Kadam Badaye Ja. The same band took part in the Royal Edinburgh Military Tattoo and the Spasskaya Tower Military Music Festival and Tattoo in 2017. In December 2019, for the first time, an Indian Army Band took part in the Victory day of Bangladesh parade.

Notable military music personnel
Lieutenant Colonel Girish Kumar Unnikrishnan, Director of Music of the Tri-Services Band in Moscow
Warrant Officer 2nd rank Suresh Kumar, director of the Indian Army Chief's Band from 1988
Captain S.S. Nagra, former Inspector of Army Bands
Harold Joseph, former music director of the Indian Army 
Jerome Rodrigues, LMME LTCL former music director of the Indian Navy
Commander Sebastian Anchees, former music director of the Indian Navy
Major Nazir Hussain, was the Advisor in Military Music at the Army Headquarters from 1997 to 2004
Major Karun Khanna, director of the Beating Retreat from 1974 to 1976
Warrant Officer Ashok Kumar, Band Master of the IAF Band since 2008
J.N. Roy Choudhary, instructor of music at the Military Music Wing and composer of Deshon Ka Sartaj Bharat 
M.S. Neer, VSM, LMME-LTCL, Former Music Director, Indian Navy
L.B. Gurung
Nirmal Chandra Vij
Master Chief Petty Officer 1st Class and Honorary Lieutenant Ramesh Chand Katoch, Band Master of the Indian Navy Band until 2018
Master Chief Petty Officer 2nd Class and Honorary Sub-Lieutenant Vincent Johnson, Band Master of the Indian Navy Band since 2018
Wing Commander Gopalakrishnan Jayachandran, Director of Music and Principal Conductor for No. 1 Air Force Band

Marches

The band performs a number of slow and quick marches such as:

 Sare Jahan se Accha (Patriotic March)
 Qadam Qadam Badaye Ja (Army Quick March)
 Samman Guard (Army Slow March)
 Desh Pukare Jab Sab Ko (Air Force Quick March)
 Vayu Sena Nishaan (Air Force Slow March)
 Jai Bharati (Navy Quick March)
 Anand Lok (Navy Slow March)
 Vande Mataram
 Deshon Ka Sartaj Bharat
 General Salute
 Naval Ensign
 Sea Lord
 Indian Fleet
 Voice of the Guns
 Have the NCC Spirit in You
 Bravo Warriors Flying Star Battle of the Sky Stride Gulmarg Benihaal Nirmaljit Amar Senani (The Immortal Soldier)
 Dhwaj Ka Rakshak (Defenders of the Flag)
 Uthari Seemaye (The Northern Frontiers)
 Suvruth (The Holy Oath)
 Vijayi Bharath (India, the Victorious)
 Hind Maha Sagar (The mighty Indian Ocean)
 Nabh Rakshak (Defenders of the Air)
 Antariksh Baan (Arrow in the Air)
 Dhwani Avrodh (Sound Barrier)
 Siki Amole'' (Precious Coins)

Gallery

See also

 India related
 Band of the Brigade of Gurkhas
 Beating retreat in India 
 Deshon Ka Sartaj Bharat
 Indian Army Chief's Band
 Military Music Wing
 Music of India
 President's Bodyguard
 Tri-Services Guard of Honour (India)
 Samman Guard
 Guard of honour

 Other related topics
 Sri Lankan military bands
 Royal Corps of Army Music
 United States military bands
 Russian military bands

Videos
Tri Services Band Concert
The Band Spasskaya Tower in 2009
Indian Air Force band performs at Beating Retreat ceremony in Delhi
Military music is alive and flourishing in the Indian armed forces!

Sources

External links
 
 
 
 

 
Military units and formations of India
Indian music
Military of India
Indian ceremonial units